The Dance of the Heart (Spanish: La danza del corazón) is a 1953 Spanish musical film directed by Raúl Alfonso and Ignacio F. Iquino and starring Tony Leblanc, Isabel de Castro and Manuel Monroy. It was made by the Barcelona-based company IFI Producción.

Synopsis 
Elena falls in love with the director of a zarzuela company as she passes through a Spanish capital. She leaves with him, but her father will oppose this relationship. Her remorse for having disobeyed her father and having left him alone does not go away, to the point of reaching the breaking point.

Cast
 Tony Leblanc as Luis Calzada  
 Isabel de Castro as Elena Montes  
 Manuel Monroy as Joaquín Solari  
 Tita Gracia as Mari Morales  
 Soledad Lence as Vicenta  
 Barta Barri as Don Pablo  
 Carlos Otero as Maestro Luján  
 María Zaldívar as Tía Rosa  
 Juan Montfort as García  
 Paco Martínez Soria as Jaime Miravall  
 Mercedes Mozart as Alejandrina

References

Bibliography 
 Àngel Comas. Diccionari de llargmetratges: el cinema a Catalunya durant la Segona República, la Guerra Civil i el franquisme (1930-1975). Cossetània Edicions, 2005.

External links 
 

1953 musical films
Spanish musical films
1953 films
1950s Spanish-language films
Films directed by Ignacio F. Iquino
Films with screenplays by Ignacio F. Iquino
Spanish black-and-white films
Films scored by Augusto Algueró
1950s Spanish films